The Sommerbergbahn is a funicular railway in Baden-Württemberg, Germany. It runs from Bad Wildbad to the top of the Wildbader Sommerberg, which gives good views over the town, with one intermediate stop.

The Sommerbergbahn opened in 1908 and was modernised in 1928 and again in 1968. In 2004 extensive work was undertaken to bring it into line with modern safety requirements. The line was closed in late 2010 for major upgrade works, with one of the cars being lifted from the line in February 2011. The line is due to open again in late Summer 2011.

The Sommerbergbahn has the following technical parameters:

Length: 
Height: 
Maximum Steepness: 53%
Configuration: single track with passing loop
Cars: 2
Capacity: 100 passengers per car
Journey time: 3.5 minutes
Track gauge: 
Traction: Electricity

Since 2002, the lower station of the Sommerbegbahn has been served by a stop on the tramway extension of line S6 of the Karlsruhe Stadtbahn, which connects Bad Wildbad to Pforzheim via the Enztalbahn.

See also 
 List of funicular railways

References

Bibliography 

 Festschrift 50 Jahre Bergbahn zum Sommerberg, 1908–1958, Druckerei Eisele, Mai 1958
 Götz Bechtle: 100 Jahre Sommerbergbahn in Bad Wildbad; S. 75-89 in Ein Jahrbuch, Band 26, 2008, Herausgeber: Landkreis Calw, 
 Götz Bechtle: Festbroschüre 100 Jahre SommerBergbahn Bad Wildbad 1908-2008, Herausgeber Stadtwerke Wildbad 2008, erhältlich bei Touristik Bad Wildbad GmbH

External links 
 
 Web site of the funicular operator (in German)

Railway lines in Baden-Württemberg
Funicular railways in Germany
Metre gauge railways in Germany
Railway lines opened in 1908
1908 establishments in Germany